Robic or Robič may refer to:
Robic (surname)
ROBIC, an intellectual property firm based in Montreal, Canada
 Robic — programming language, created in USSR.
 Robik — ZX spectrum based home education PC, produced is USSR from 1989 to 1994.
 Robič settlement under Matajur in the Slovenia.